Dry is a Cantopop music duo that formed between 1997 and 1998 with Mark Lui and Stephen Fung as bandmates. The group was formed when Mark decided to create a band with himself and another person. After meeting Stephen through friends introductions, they agreed to start a music duo with Universal Music. A year after they formed, they decided to part ways to pursue different career paths. Mark continued as songwriter to many cantopop artists such as Leon Lai and Miriam Yeung. While Stephen started his career in acting and later shift toward to directing and producing Hong Kong films such as Enter the Phoenix.

Even the group only lasted about a year, they have produced 3 studio albums and one compilation album.

Discography

Awards

Dry
Cantonese-language singers
Hong Kong boy bands